Glenn Clarke (born 26 July 1963) is an Australian former cyclist. He competed in the points race event at the 1984 Summer Olympics.

References

External links
 

1963 births
Living people
Australian male cyclists
Olympic cyclists of Australia
Cyclists at the 1984 Summer Olympics
People from Wangaratta
Commonwealth Games medallists in cycling
Commonwealth Games gold medallists for Australia
Cyclists at the 1986 Commonwealth Games
20th-century Australian people
21st-century Australian people
Medallists at the 1986 Commonwealth Games